The 1968 Columbia 200 was a NASCAR Grand National Series stock car race that was held on April 18, 1968, at Columbia Speedway in Columbia, South Carolina.

Background
Columbia Speedway was an oval racetrack located in Cayce, a suburb of Columbia, South Carolina. It was the site of auto races for NASCAR's top series from 1951 through 1971.  For most of its history, the racing surface was dirt.  The races in April and August 1970 were two of the final three Grand National races ever held on a dirt track.

The track was paved before hosting its last two Grand National races in 1971.

While Columbia Speedway was shut down to cars in 1979, noise complaints, it reopened as a velodrome in 2001.

Race report
The race lasted one hour and twenty-four minutes with five cautions being handed out by NASCAR officials.

Bobby Isaac would defeat Charlie Glotzbach by less than one lap in front of 6500 live spectators (thus recording Nord Krauskopf's first win as a NASCAR team owner. After this race, no vehicle with the number 37 would even win a NASCAR Grand National Series race ever again.

Out of the 23-car field, 22 cars would be driven by American-born drivers while the other vehicle would be driven by Canadian driver Frog Fagan. Bob Cooper would acquire the race's last-place finish due to an alternator issue on lap 42. Until 1972, Daytona 500 qualifiers were valid for the championship, Isaac would get his second win of the season at this race.

Until 1972, Daytona 500 qualifiers were valid for the championship, so Bobby Isaac got his second win of his NASCAR Grand National Cup Series career. Meanwhile, Mopar (Dodge and Plymouth) would have its vehicles finish in the top five. Total prize winnings handed out at the race was $4,490 ($ when adjusted for inflation); with $1,000 being handed out to the winner ($ when adjusted for inflation) while the last-place finisher not winning any money.

Notable crew chiefs at the race were Dale Inman, Harry Hyde, Frankie Scott, and Jake Elder.

Qualifying

Finishing order
Section reference:

 Bobby Isaac† (No. 37)
 Charlie Glotzbach (No. 6)
 James Hylton (No. 48)
 Buddy Baker (No. 3)
 Richard Petty (No. 43)
 John Sears† (No. 4)
 David Pearson† (No. 17)
 Elmo Langley† (No. 64)
 LeeRoy Yarbrough† (No. 56)
 Neil Castles (No. 06)
 Clyde Lynn† (No. 20)
 Buck Baker† (No. 88)
 Wendell Scott† (No. 34)
 Roy Tyner† (No. 9)
 Jabe Thomas (No. 25)
 Henley Gray (No. 19)
 Bill Vanderhoff* (No. 09)
 Bill Seifert* (No. 45)
 Frog Fagan*† (No. 95)
 Ben Arnold* (No. 76)
 Paul Dean Holt* (No. 31)
 Ed Negre* (No. 8)
 Bob Cooper* (No. 02)

* Driver failed to finish race 
† signifies that the driver is known to be deceased

Timeline
Section reference:
 Start of race: Richard Petty started the race with the pole position.
 Lap 15: Bobby Isaac took over the lead from Richard Petty.
 Lap 42: The alternator on Bob Cooper's vehicle became problematic, forcing him out of the race.
 Lap 51: Ed Negre developed problems with his vehicle's rear end, causing him to leave the race.
 Lap 52: Vibrations could be felt on Paul Dean Holt's vehicle, ending his day on the track.
 Lap 56: Ben Arnold's vehicle also had some vibration problems, forcing him to leave the event.
 Lap 62: Frog Fagan would have problems with his vehicle's engine, causing him to exit from the race prematurely.
 Lap 63: Bill Seifert's engine became problematic; making him leave the race without properly finishing it.
 Lap 78: The rear end of Bill Vanderhoff's vehicle gave out, causing him to exit the race early.
 Finish: Bobby Isaac was officially declared the winner of the event.

References

Columbia 200
Columbia 200
NASCAR races at Columbia Speedway